Mokriyan-e Sharqi Rural District is in the Central District of Mahabad County, West Azerbaijan province, Iran. At the National Census of 2006, its population was 12,831 in 2,418 households. There were 15,157 inhabitants in 3,823 households at the following census of 2011. At the most recent census of 2016, the population of the rural district was 15,545 in 4,011 households. The largest of its 23 villages was Gug Tappeh, with 6,947 people.

References 

Mahabad County

Rural Districts of West Azerbaijan Province

Populated places in West Azerbaijan Province

Populated places in Mahabad County